The Chieti trolleybus system forms part of the public transport network of the city and comune of Chieti, in the region of Abruzzo, central Italy.  In operation since 2009, the system comprises one urban route.

From 1950 to 1992, Chieti was served by an earlier manifestation of the same trolleybus route.  Currently, 17 Italian cities or metropolitan areas have trolleybus systems, counting four where the system is a new one under construction, and of all of these, Chieti is the smallest in population.  By the early 1980s, it was already the smallest Italian city to retain trolleybus service (with Carrara second).

History
The original Chieti trolleybus system was inaugurated on 16 July 1950, in place of an obsolete tramway that had been in operation since 1905.  The system's single line connected Chieti railway station (stazione FS), located in the valley of the Pescara River (in the large suburb of Chieti Scalo), with the city centre, situated on a hill.

The line's route was Madonna delle Piane - stazione FS - centro città - Sant'Anna, with an especially steep and very tortuous path between the station and the city centre.
 
The original line offered an excellent service for decades.  However, the necessary funds to update its technology were lacking (except for the renewal of the trolleybus fleet in the mid-1980s).  Thus, in 1992, due to the poor condition of the overhead wires, it was deemed necessary to suspend the service until such time as a thorough repair or complete reconstruction could be undertaken. The reconstruction work, originally expected to take place within just a few years, was delayed by lack of funding and did not finally begin until 2002, then dragged on for several more years, with many breaks. The service was finally reactivated on 26 September 2009.  New substations installed as part of the reconstruction work increased the overhead line voltage from 600 V to 750 V.

Current services
Line 1 is currently operated as the route Colle dell'Ara (Hospital & University campus) - Piazzale dei Martiri Pennesi (Madonna delle Piane) - railway station (in Chieti Scalo) - city centre - Sant'Anna, with a limited number of trolleybuses, operating on their own only in the morning; in the afternoons and during holidays, the trolleybuses are supplemented with diesel powered buses.

Trolleybus fleet

Retired trolleybuses
The following trolleybuses were used on Chieti's first trolleybus system:
Fiat 668F: Chieti's original fleet of these trolleybuses was supplemented in the 1960s by the acquisition of four more from the Genoa trolleybus system.
 Menarini 201 FLU (nos. 212–221): replaced the Fiat 668Fs in late 1985 or early 1986.

Current fleet
Chieti's present trolleybus fleet is made up of only the following:
 Menarini 201 FLU (nos. 212–221): seven of the ten trolleybuses acquired in 1985 have been completely refurbished and given a two-tone yellow-green livery:  Nos. 212, 213, 215, 217, 219, 220 and 221. The remaining 3 were scrapped after being cannibalized for spare parts for the remainder of the fleet.
 Five VanHool A330T.

See also

List of trolleybus systems in Italy

References

Notes

Books

External links

 Images of the Chieti trolleybus system, at photorail.com
 Images of the Chieti trolleybus system, at railfaneurope.net

This article is based upon a translation of the Italian language version as at July 2011.

Chieti
Chieti
Chieti
Transport in Abruzzo